Pseudoderopeltis is a genus of cockroaches in the family Blattidae found principally in sub-Saharan Africa.

References

Cockroaches
Cockroach genera